The 2013 Rakuten Japan Open Tennis Championships was a men's tennis tournament played on outdoor hard courts. It was the 40th edition of the event known this year as the Rakuten Japan Open Tennis Championships, and part of the 500 Series of the 2013 ATP World Tour. It was held at the Ariake Coliseum in Tokyo, Japan, from September 30 till October 6, 2013.

Points and prize money

Point distribution

Prize money

Singles main-draw entrants

Seeds

 1 Rankings are as of September 23, 2013.

Other entrants
The following players received wildcards into the singles main draw:
  Juan Martín del Potro
  Tatsuma Ito
  Go Soeda 
  Yūichi Sugita

The following players received entry from the qualifying draw:
  Benjamin Becker
  Marco Chiudinelli
  Ryan Harrison
  Édouard Roger-Vasselin

The following players received entry as lucky losers:
  Lukáš Lacko
  Michał Przysiężny

Withdrawals
Before the tournament
  Michaël Llodra (back injury)
  Andy Murray (back surgery)
  Gilles Simon (groin injury)

Doubles main-draw entrants

Seeds

 Rankings are as of September 23, 2013

Other entrants
The following pairs received wildcards into the doubles main draw:
  Tatsuma Ito /  Go Soeda
  Kei Nishikori /  Yasutaka Uchiyama

The following pair received entry as alternates:
  Andre Begemann /  Martin Emmrich

Withdrawals
Before the tournament
  Michaël Llodra (back injury)

Champions

Singles

 Juan Martín del Potro defeated  Milos Raonic, 7–6(7–5), 7–5

Doubles

 Rohan Bopanna /  Édouard Roger-Vasselin defeated  Jamie Murray /  John Peers, 7–6(7–5), 6–4

References

External links 
 

Rakuten Japan Open Tennis Championships
Japan Open (tennis)
Rakuten Japan Open Tennis Championships
Rakuten Japan Open Tennis Championships
Rakuten Japan Open Tennis Championships